A crime victim advocacy program is a program to assist victims of crime through the criminal justice system. Such a program assists victims of a "General Crime", that is, as any crime committed that is not domestic or sexual in nature. Common examples of general crimes are murder, robbery, identity theft, burglary, vandalism, hate crimes, assault, and threats.

Typically, victims of general crimes are an underserved group. Most victim advocacy programs focus on either DV (domestic violence) or SA (sexual assault). Survivors also advocate for improved court procedures and legal assistance for victims. Many crime victims are unfamiliar with the criminal justice system, due to recent immigration, language barriers, or ignorance.

See also
 Advocacy
 Criminal justice
 Victimology
 Victims' rights

References

Crime
Victims' rights